Circle USD 375 is a public unified school district headquartered in Towanda, Kansas, United States.  The district includes the communities of Towanda, Benton, Greenwich, Midian, western El Dorado, eastern Bel Aire, and nearby rural areas.

Schools
The school district has six schools:
 Circle High School
 Circle Middle School
 Circle Benton Elementary School
 Circle Greenwich Elementary School
 Circle Oil Hill Elementary School
 Circle Towanda Elementary School

See also
 Kansas State Department of Education
 Kansas State High School Activities Association
 List of high schools in Kansas
 List of unified school districts in Kansas

References

External links
 

School districts in Kansas